Highgate Center is the primary village and a census-designated place (CDP) in the town of Highgate, Franklin County, Vermont, United States. As of the 2020 census it had a population of 361, out of 3,472 in the entire town of Highgate.

The CDP is in northwestern Franklin County, in the south-central part of the town of Highgate. It sits on the north side of the Missisquoi River, a west-flowing tributary of Lake Champlain, where the river passes over Highgate Falls. Vermont Route 78 (Franklin Street) passes through the center of the village, leading southeast  to Vermont Route 105 at Sheldon Junction and southwest  to Swanton. Vermont Route 207 also passes through the village, leading south  to St. Albans and northeast  to the Canadian border at Morses Line.

References 

Populated places in Franklin County, Vermont
Census-designated places in Franklin County, Vermont
Census-designated places in Vermont